Neogalerucella pusilla is a species of skeletonizing leaf beetle in the family Chrysomelidae. It is found in Europe and Northern Asia (excluding China) and North America.

References

Further reading

 
 

Galerucinae
Articles created by Qbugbot
Beetles described in 1825